Jekyll & Hyde is a fourth studio album by South African rock band Prime Circle. It was released through EMI Music South Africa. The album gained recognition mainly due to its hits "Breathing", "Turning in my Sleep", and "All of Me".

Track listing

"Closure" –3:32      
"Broken Promises" –3:30    
"Breathing" –3:39     
"Everything You Want" –3:38   
"All Of Me" –3:59      
"Turning in My Sleep" –4:32     
"Never Gonna Bring Us Down" –3:48      
"I'm Ready" –4:02     
"Worth the Fight" –3:41     
"Not the Same" –3:27      
"Turn Me to Stone" –3:23     
"Jekyll & Hyde" –6:47

Prime Circle albums
2010 albums